David Albós Cavaliere (born 7 March 1984) is an Andorran former professional road racing cyclist. He competed with CJAM-CKT-Novatec in 2011, and also with the national team, Agrupació Ciclista Andorrana.

Albós competed in the 2011, the 2012, the 2013, and the 2015 UCI World Time Trial Championships. Albós won the National Time Trial Championships a record seven times. Originally a skier, Albós began competitive cycling in 2008. His brothers Ludovic Albós Cavaliere and Joan Albós Cavaliere are ski mountaineers.

Major results

2008
 1st  Time trial, National Road Championships
2009
 1st  Time trial, National Road Championships
2010
 1st  Time trial, National Road Championships
2011
 1st  Time trial, National Road Championships
 5th Time trial, Games of the Small States of Europe
2012
 1st  Time trial, National Time Trial Championships
2013
 2nd Time trial, National Road Championships
 6th Time trial, Games of the Small States of Europe
2014
 1st  Time trial, National Road Championships
2015
 1st  Time trial, National Road Championships

References

External links

1984 births
Living people
People from Escaldes-Engordany
Road racing cyclists
Andorran male cyclists
European Games competitors for Andorra
Cyclists at the 2015 European Games